Jeremy Van Horebeek (born 28 November 1989) is a Belgian professional motocross rider.
Van Horebeek began competing in the 2021 MXGP riding the newly introduced Beta 450RX. He placed 9th overall in the Covid delayed season opener in Orlyonok, Russia.  He was 7th in the 2022 MXoN open class.

Career 
 2012 FIM Motocross World Championship MX2 3rd place
 2013 Motocross des Nations Champion
 2014 FIM Motocross World Championship MXGP 2nd place
 2015 FIM Motocross World Championship MXGP 5th place
 2016 FIM Motocross World Championship MXGP 6th place
 2017 FIM Motocross World Championship MXGP 7th place
 2018 FIM Motocross World Championship MXGP 9th place
 2019 FIM Motocross World Championship MXGP 8th place
 2020 FIM Motocross World Championship MXGP 9th place
 2021 Italian International Championship 3rd place

References

External links
 Jeremy Van Horebeek at MXGP
 

Living people
1989 births
Belgian motocross riders
People from Braine-l'Alleud
Sportspeople from Walloon Brabant